In chemistry, 3,3,4,4-tetramethyltetrahydrofuran or 3,3,4,4-tetramethyloxolane is a heterocyclic compound with the formula , or (CH3)2((CH2)C2(CH2)O)(CH3)2.  It can be seen as derivative of tetrahydrofuran (oxolane) with two methyl groups replacing two hydrogen atoms on each of the carbon atoms in the ring that are not adjacent to the oxygen.  It can be seen also as a cyclic ether of 2,2,3,3-tetramethylbutane, an isomer of octane.

Synthesis and chemistry
The compound can be prepared by heating 2,2,3,3-Tetramethylbutane-1,4-diol in dimethylsulfoxide at 160 °C.
The compound is decomposed by butyllithium with cleavage of the ring, and this reaction has been considered as a way of obtaining lithium enolates of aldehydes.

In a superacid solution (--), the oxygen atom is protonated, and the carbon chain is split at the 3-4 bond, which gets replaced by bonds from carbons 3 and 4 to the oxygen atom. The formula of the resulting species could be written as (–()2C-CH2–)2.

See also
 3,4-Dimethylfuran
 2,2,5,5-Tetramethyltetrahydrofuran
 3,3,4,4-Tetramethyltetrahydrofuran-2,5-dione

References

Tetrahydrofurans